The Sixteenth Wife is a 1917 American silent comedy-drama film directed by Charles Brabin and starring Peggy Hyland, Marc McDermott and George J. Forth.

Cast
 Peggy Hyland as Olette 
 Marc McDermott as Kadir El Raschid 
 George J. Forth as Jimmy Warburton 
 Templar Saxe as Hackel

References

Bibliography
 David Quinlan. Quinlan's Film Directors. Batsford, 1999.

External links
 

1917 films
1917 comedy-drama films
1910s English-language films
American silent feature films
American black-and-white films
Films directed by Charles Brabin
Vitagraph Studios films
1910s American films
Silent American comedy-drama films